Mary Lawler (born November 25, 1944) is an American speed skater. She competed in two events at the 1964 Winter Olympics.

References

1944 births
Living people
American female speed skaters
Olympic speed skaters of the United States
Speed skaters at the 1964 Winter Olympics
Sportspeople from Minneapolis